A scroll is a roll of parchment, papyrus, or paper, which has been drawn or written upon.

Scroll may also refer to:

Art
 Scroll (art), an element of ornament and graphic design featuring spirals and rolling incomplete circle motifs, often based on plants
 Scrollwork, ornament dominated by scrolls (motifs), found in a variety of artistic media
 Scroll painting, a painting on a scroll (media) in Asian traditions, distinguishing between:
Handscroll, such a painting in horizontal format
Hanging scroll, such a painting in vertical format

News
Scroll.in, an Indian news website

Web services
Scroll (web service), a web service that disables ads on partner websites in exchange for a subscription fee

Other
 Scroll (music), the decoratively curved end of the pegbox of string instruments such as violins
 Scrolling (video and computing), the continuous movement of text/graphics over a video screen or display window
 on touchscreens, a single or multi-touch gesture, done by swiping one's finger(s) vertically  
 Scroll, a ruled surface in a rational normal scroll in algebraic geometry
 Scroll, a traditional pattern used in danish pastry
 Scroll pump (engineering), a type of rotary positive displacement pump

See also
 Scrolls (video game), a video game by Mojang
 The Scrolls, an American musical octet